"Signore, ascolta!" ("My lord, listen!") is a soprano aria in act one of the opera Turandot by Giacomo Puccini. The Italian lyrics were written by Giuseppe Adami and Renato Simoni.

It is sung by Liù (a slave girl) to Prince Calaf, whom she is secretly in love with. Liù sings this aria begging Calaf not to risk his life for his love to a beautiful but cold Princess Turandot, who set a condition that any man who wishes to marry her must first answer her three riddles, and if he fails, he will be beheaded.

Liù's words touch the Prince's heart, and he replies with "Non piangere, Liù" ("Don't cry, Liù").

Libretto

References

External links
 , Leona Mitchell
 "Signore, ascolta!", sheet music, 8notes.com site. Retrieved 17 July 2018
 Maria Callas video, lyrics and translation, Opera Lady blogspot. Retrieved 17 July 2018

Arias by Giacomo Puccini
Opera excerpts
1926 compositions
Soprano arias